Olav Vesaas (born 21 December 1935) is a Norwegian journalist, biographer and publisher.

He was born in Vinje to novelist Tarjei Vesaas and poet Halldis Moren Vesaas, and is a brother of Guri Vesaas. From 1968 to 1998 he was assigned with the Norwegian Broadcasting Corporation, where he mainly hosted programs on literature. From 1974 to 1990 he hosted the linguistic radio show Språkrøret, along with philologist Finn-Erik Vinje. From 1978 to 1980 he chaired the Nynorsk publishing house Det Norske Samlaget. In 2018 he was awarded ,  for his lifelong contributions to literature and language.

Selected works
Løynde land (1995, biography of Tarjei Vesaas)
A.O. Vinje – ein tankens hermann (2001, biography of Aasmund Olavsson Vinje) 
Å vera i livet (2007, biography of Halldis Moren Vesaas).

References

1935 births
Living people
People from Vinje
NRK people
Norwegian radio presenters
Nynorsk-language writers
Norwegian biographers